Billy Joe Booth (April 7, 1940 – June 30, 1972) was an American-born Canadian football player. He played professional football with the Ottawa Rough Riders in the Canadian Football League from 1962 to 1970. A graduate of Louisiana State University in Baton Rouge, he was drafted by the New York Giants in round thirteen, draft number 181 of the 1962 NFL draft. Booth was killed in a plane crash in Ontario in 1972.

References

1940 births
1972 deaths